Edgar Milton Meuli (20 February 1926 – 15 April 2007) was a New Zealand cricketer who played in one Test in 1953. He played 42 matches of first-class cricket in New Zealand between 1945 and 1959.

Cricket career
Ted Meuli was born in Hawera and raised in New Plymouth where he attended New Plymouth Boys' High School, captaining the school's First XI. He was a right-handed batsman and occasional leg-spin bowler who made his first-class debut in 1945–46, playing three games for Auckland. His next first-class matches were in 1950–51 for Central Districts when they made their first appearance in the Plunket Shield. He spent the rest of his first-class career, which finished in 1959–60, with Central Districts. He also played for Taranaki in the non-first-class Hawke Cup from 1946–47 to 1968–69.

In the Plunket Shield in 1952–53 he made 317 runs at 52.83, including 154 against Auckland, batting at number three, out of a team total of 319 in a low-scoring match that Central Districts won by an innings. A week earlier he had taken 6 for 67 against Otago.

He was selected in the team for the First Test against South Africa in Wellington in 1952–53, making 15 and 23 batting in the middle order, and not bowling, although South Africa's innings lasted 174 overs. He was one of five players who lost their places for the Second Test; along with Eric Fisher, the Wellington Test was his sole appearance for New Zealand.

Meuli hit one more century, in 1956–57 against Northern Districts, once again in a low-scoring match that Central Districts won by an innings. It was the first century scored against Northern Districts, who were playing their first season in the Plunket Shield.

Later life
Meuli spent his working life as a school teacher in New Plymouth. He died in April 2007, survived by Nerida, his wife of 53 years, and their three sons.

See also
 List of Auckland representative cricketers
 One-Test wonder
 Moturoa AFC

References

External links
 Ted Meuli at Cricinfo

1926 births
2007 deaths
New Zealand Test cricketers
New Zealand cricketers
Auckland cricketers
Central Districts cricketers
Cricketers from Hāwera